Viljandi Ice Hall is an ice arena in Viljandi, Estonia.

The hall was opened in 2006.

The hall has an ice arena with dimensions of 30 x 60 m.

The hall is used by two ice hockey clubs/teams: Estonia U20 and Viljandi Hokiklubi.

References

External links
 

Indoor arenas in Estonia
Viljandi
Indoor ice hockey venues in Estonia
Sport in Viljandi
2006 establishments in Estonia
Sports venues completed in 2006